John Ellis (died 1400 or after), of New Romney, Kent, was an English Member of Parliament.

He was a Member (MP) of the Parliament of England for New Romney in 1385, September 1388 and 1391.

References

14th-century births
15th-century deaths
14th-century English people
People from New Romney
Members of the Parliament of England (pre-1707)